Desperado is a 1995 American neo-Western action film written, produced, and directed by Robert Rodriguez. It is the second part of Rodriguez's Mexico Trilogy. It stars Antonio Banderas as El Mariachi who seeks revenge on the drug lord who killed his lover. The film was screened out of competition at the 1995 Cannes Film Festival. Desperado grossed $58 million worldwide. It has been cited as Salma Hayek's breakout role.

Plot
In August 1994 at the Tarasco bar in Mexico, an American man named Buscemi tells the story of witnessing a massacre in another bar, committed by a Mexican who had a guitar case full of guns. The bar's patrons are uninterested until Buscemi mentions the name "Bucho". Meanwhile, El Mariachi has a dream of his encounter with Moco, Bucho's underling, who killed his lover and shot his left hand, but Buscemi awakens him and tells him to continue searching for Bucho.

El Mariachi meets a child, whose father allegedly plays guitar for a living. Having been a guitarist himself, he gives the boy some guitar lessons. At the Tarasco bar, El Mariachi engages in a tense standoff with Bucho's henchmen, followed by a massive gunfight. El Mariachi kills everyone in the bar but Tavo, who was in a back room conducting illegal business. Tavo survives and follows El Mariachi outside and wounds him, but is killed by El Mariachi. Carolina, a woman who El Mariachi shielded from Tavo's bullets, takes him to her bookstore. Bucho arrives at the bar to survey the carnage. Threatened by the situation, Bucho orders his men to hunt down the man "dressed in black".

At her bookstore, Carolina tends to El Mariachi's wounds. While he rests, she discovers the guns in his guitar case and deduces his identity, based on Buscemi's story. El Mariachi asks her to help him locate Bucho. He goes to the town church and talks to Buscemi. Upset by the massacre at the bar, Buscemi convinces El Mariachi to abandon his quest for revenge. Outside the church, they are ambushed by a man armed with throwing knives, who kills Buscemi and severely wounds El Mariachi. Bucho's men arrive at the scene, and mistake the man (who dresses in black) for El Mariachi and kill him. They take the body back to Bucho, who realizes they have killed the wrong person, a hitman named Navajas sent by the Colombians to kill El Mariachi.

As an injured El Mariachi wanders the streets he meets the kid with the guitar, once again. He learns that the kid is being used by his father to mule drugs hidden in his guitar. He angrily confronts the boy, who tells him most people in the town work for Bucho. El Mariachi returns to Carolina and learns that Bucho financed her bookstore as an additional front for his drug dealing. Bucho arrives, unexpectedly, and she hastily hides El Mariachi. She feigns ignorance of the commotion in town, and Bucho leaves. Carolina completes the suturing of El Mariachi's wounds. That evening, she gives El Mariachi a new guitar, which he plays for her before they make passionate love. Meanwhile, Bucho realizes that Carolina lied to him.

In the morning, Bucho's men arrive and attack them and set the bookstore ablaze. The two fight their way out of the burning building and onto a local rooftop, where El Mariachi gets a clear shot at Bucho but inexplicably chooses not to attempt to kill him. The two hide in a hotel room.

Angry about their failure to kill El Mariachi, Bucho gathers his men and says: "You drive around town, you see someone you don't know, you shoot them! How hard is that, huh?" He shoots one man and then fires at the others, as an example.

Realizing that Bucho will never stop hunting him, El Mariachi contacts his friends, Campa and Quino, for assistance. The trio meets up on the edge of town and encounters Bucho's henchmen. A massive gun battle ensues, and most of Bucho's men, along with Campa and Quino, are killed. El Mariachi discovers that the guitar-playing boy has been wounded in the crossfire and rushes him to a hospital.

El Mariachi and Carolina travel to Bucho's compound intending to confront him. It is then revealed that Bucho is El Mariachi's older brother, Cesar. El Mariachi was unaware of "Bucho's" identity, until he saw his brother's face, from the rooftop, and refrained from shooting him. Bucho offers to release El Mariachi if he allows Bucho to kill Carolina. El Mariachi kills his brother, then shoots the remaining henchmen. The two visit the boy in the hospital, and El Mariachi leaves him alone. Carolina catches up to him on the road and picks him up, with El Mariachi initially leaving his weapons on the side of the road. The two drive away together, but shortly return and pick up the guitar case, full of guns, just to be safe.

Cast

Production
Rodriguez's friend Quentin Tarantino has a cameo as "Pick-up Guy". Carlos Gallardo, who played the title role of El Mariachi, appears in Desperado as Campa, a friend of Banderas' Mariachi. Since Banderas replaced Gallardo as the actor for the main character, the filmmakers re-shot the final showdown from El Mariachi as a flashback sequence for Banderas' character in Desperado.

Raúl Juliá was originally cast as Bucho but died on October 24, 1994, before production began.

Principal photography took place entirely in Ciudad Acuña, Mexico, across from Del Rio, Texas.

During the filming of the sex scene, Salma Hayek became very uncomfortable and started uncontrollably crying.

Hayek made clear several times that Rodriguez and Banderas “were amazing” and that Rodriguez “never put pressure on me.”

Rating
After it was submitted to the Motion Picture Association of America, the film was granted an NC-17 due to graphic violence and it had to be severely cut for an R rating. Among the scenes that were trimmed are the deaths of Tarantino's character and his friend at the bar, as well as Trejo's character. By far the most major excision came at the end of the film, which originally contained a large-scale shootout between El Mariachi, Carolina, Bucho, and his thugs at Bucho's mansion. Owing to the amount of footage the MPAA demanded be removed from the scene, Rodriguez elected to remove the sequence in its entirety, giving the film its current fade-out ending. Two additional scenes were also deleted featuring the codpiece gun (seen in the guitar case). Originally, the gun was used by El Mariachi during the second bar shootout when he uses it to shoot the first thug before whipping out his pistols from his sleeves and finishing him off. In a second deleted scene, the crotch gun was to go off accidentally while Banderas is in bed with Hayek, blowing a hole through the guitar while they were playing it. The gun was eventually used in unrelated Rodriguez's films From Dusk till Dawn and Machete Kills.

Music

The film's score is written and performed by the Los Angeles rock band, Los Lobos, performing Chicano rock and traditional Ranchera music. Their performance of "Mariachi Suite" won the Grammy Award for Best Pop Instrumental Performance at the 1995 Grammy Awards. Other artists on the soundtrack album include Dire Straits, Link Wray, Latin Playboys, and Carlos Santana. Musician Tito Larriva has a small role in the film, and his band, Tito & Tarantula, contributed to the soundtrack as well.

Reception

Critical reception
On Rotten Tomatoes the film has an approval rating of 67% based on reviews from 48 critics, with an average rating of 6.5/10, The sites consensus reads, "Desperado contains almost too much action and too little story to sustain interest, but Antonio Banderas proves a charismatic lead in Robert Rodriguez's inventive extravaganza." On Metacritic it has a score of 55 out of 100, based on reviews from 18 critics, indicating "mixed or average reviews". Audiences polled by CinemaScore gave the film an average grade of "B+" on an A+ to F scale.

Todd McCarthy of Variety wrote that the film "could scarcely be more dazzling on a purely visual level, but it's mortally anemic in the story, character and thematic departments." Owen Gleiberman of Entertainment Weekly rated the film "B" and praised the action sequences despite the lack of characterization. Janet Maslin of The New York Times wrote, "Overdependence on violence also marginalizes Desperado as a gun-slinging novelty item, instead of the broader effort toward which this talented young director might have aspired."

Roger Ebert of The Chicago Sun-Times rated it 2 out of 4 stars and wrote, "What happens looks terrific. Now if he can harness that technical facility to a screenplay that's more story than setup, he might really have something." Desson Howe of The Washington Post wrote, "the commercial transition has been remarkably successful. This is primarily thanks to Rodriguez, who not only retains the original movie's kinetic flair, but takes it further." Bob McCabe of Empire rated it 4 out of 5 stars and wrote, "It's big, it's daft, but Desperado is confident and hugely entertaining filmmaking." Heidi Strom of the Daily Press wrote, "A pure adrenaline rush from start to finish, "Desperado" will shock, amuse, thrill and disgust – but never disappoint."

Box office
The film grossed $25.4 million in the United States and Canada and $58 million worldwide.

References

External links

 
 
 
 
 
 

1995 films
1995 Western (genre) films
1990s action films
American action films
American Western (genre) films
American sequel films
Spanish-language American films
Films about Mexican drug cartels
Films about guitars and guitarists
American films about revenge
Gun fu films
Mexico Trilogy
Columbia Pictures films
Troublemaker Studios films
Films directed by Robert Rodriguez
Films produced by Elizabeth Avellán
Films produced by Robert Rodriguez
Films set in Mexico
Films shot in Mexico
Films with screenplays by Robert Rodriguez
1990s English-language films
1990s Spanish-language films
1990s American films